The municipality of Lahntal is found in the Marburg-Biedenkopf district in northwest Middle Hesse, Germany.

Geography
Lahntal lies on the upper Lahn about 83 km north of Frankfurt am Main and about 7 km northwest of Marburg. In the north, it borders on the town of Wetter, in the east on the community of Cölbe, in the south on Marburg, and in the west on the community of Dautphetal.

West of the community rises the 498 m-high Rimberg.

Constituent communities
 Brungershausen
 Caldern
 Göttingen
 Goßfelden
 Kernbach
 Sarnau
 Sterzhausen

Politics

Municipal representation

(last municipal election: 26 March 2006)

Coat of arms
Lahntal's civic coat of arms might be described thus: In gules an inescutcheon showing the shield of the Teutonic Knights (in argent a cross sable), laid over a fess wavy argent; behind the inescutcheon tilted dexter and turned sinister an abbess's staff Or with velum argent; spangled with seven trefoils, three above the fess and four below.

The coat of arms was adopted as part of the municipal reform in Hesse, and the wavy fess represents the community's namesake river. The clovers represent the seven constituent communities within Lahntal's bounds; moreover, the abbess's staff stands for Caldern, where there was once a convent, and the Teutonic Knights' shield stands for Goßfelden, which lies south of the river Lahn.

Municipal partnerships
  Stara Kiszewa, Poland
  Sussargues, France

Lahntal has been partnered since 6 April 1986 with the community of Sussargues, which lies in the department of Hérault in southern France, right near Montpellier (about 17 km) and the Mediterranean Sea. Lahntal and Sussargues lie about 1 050 km apart.

Between the Polish community of Stara Kiszewa and Lahntal, a community partnership was ceremoniously sealed in Poland on 10 January 2005. The underwriting of the intercommunal deal in Lahntal took place on 26 May 2006. Stara Kiszewa has about 6,200 inhabitants in some 20 centres, some quite small, and is in the powiat of Kościerzyna, about 80 km south of Gdańsk and 80 km west of Malbork in the tourist region of Kashubia.

Culture and Sightseeing

Buildings
 Rimberg Tower near Caldern
 Defensive church tower in Sterzhausen from the 12th or 13th century.
 Old Lahn Bridge in Goßfelden
 Otto-Ubbelohde-Haus in Goßfelden

Economy and infrastructure

Transport
Running west–east through the municipal area is the Federal Highway (Bundesstraße) B 62 coming from Biedenkopf and going on towards Cölbe and farther to Alsfeld. In Lahntal-Göttingen, the B 252 from Diemelstadt and Korbach to the north comes to an end.

The Obere Lahntalbahn, a single-track Deutsche Bahn unelectrified secondary railway line run by DB's Kurhessenbahn subsidiary, joins Marburg by way of Biedenkopf and Bad Laasphe with Erndtebrück. Stops on the line may be found at Sarnau (full station), Goßfelden, Sterzhausen and Caldern.

Tourism
The community of Lahntal belongs, along with parts of its environs to the Burgwald region, the Lahn tourism region and the Lahn-Dill Nature Park; it also lies on the Lahntal bicycle trail.

Established enterprises
 Lauf&Masche

Personalities

Sons and daughters of the town
Otto Ubbelohde, drawer and painter
Christean Wagner, Hessian politician
 Dr. Richard Munz, awarded the Bundesverdienstkreuz on ribbon on 17 January 2003

Others associated with the community
Brothers Grimm

References

External links

Lahntal's official website
Brungershausen's unofficial website
www.gossfelden.de Goßfelden's unofficial website
www.sterzhausen.de Sterzhausen's unofficial website

Marburg-Biedenkopf